Final Offer is a Canadian film documenting the 1984 contract negotiations between the United Auto Workers Union (UAW) and GM. Ultimately, it provided a historical record of the birth of the Canadian Auto Workers Union (CAW) as Bob White, the head of the Canadian sector of the UAW, led his membership out of the International Union and created the CAW.

The movie depicts life in an era of massive industrial change in North America. The audience sees the emergence of automation and how it begins to affect the lives of the working class. Other themes depicted are labour relations, life on the picket line, and corporate restructuring.

A National Film Board of Canada production, Final Offer is directed by Sturla Gunnarsson and Robert Collison, written by Collison, and produced by Collison, Gunnarsson and John Spotton.

The movie features Henry Ramer as the narrator, Buzz Hargrove, Roger Smith, chairman of General Motors, and founding CAW president Bob White.

Awards
 Banff Mountain Film Festival, Banff, Alberta: Grand Prize of the Festival, 1986
 Banff Mountain Film Festival, Banff, Alberta: Rockie Award for Best Political and Social Documentary, 1986
 7th Genie Awards, Toronto: Best Feature Length Documentary, 1986
 Golden Gate International Film Festival, San Francisco: Special Jury Award, 1986
 Columbus International Film & Animation Festival, Columbus, Ohio: Chris Award, First Prize, Industry & Commerce, 1986
 Chicago International Film Festival, Chicago: Gold Plaque, Social/Political Documentary, 1986
 Prix Italia, International Competition for Radio and Television Productions, Lucca, Italy: Italia Award for Best Documentary, 1986

See also
Roger & Me – 1989 documentary film, featuring Roger Smith and Michael Moore

References

External links
Watch Final Offer at NFB.ca

English-language Canadian films
Canadian documentary films
National Film Board of Canada documentaries
General Motors
Canadian Auto Workers
United Auto Workers
Economic history of Canada
Labour history of Canada
Films directed by Sturla Gunnarsson
Documentary films about the labor movement
Best Documentary Film Genie and Canadian Screen Award winners
1985 documentary films
Documentary films about the automotive industry
1980s English-language films
1980s Canadian films
Labour history of Ontario